Amole may refer to:

 Amole, a common name for plants in the genera Chlorogalum and Hooveria, as well as some plants in Agave (like Agave longiflora and Agave schottii)
 Amole Gupte (born c. 1962), Indian screenwriter, actor, and director
 Doc Amole (1878–1912), American baseball player

See also 
 Amol (disambiguation)